Boswellia frereana is a species of plant native to northern Somalia where the locals call it "Dhidin" or "Maydi" (other spellings include: Meydi, Meyti, Maidi, Maieti, and Mayeti) or the king of all frankincense. It is also known as the Yigaar (or Yegaar) tree  and by the common name for all frankincense, Luban. The eponym of the genus references William Edward Frere, Member of Council at Bombay.

Other than its aromatic uses, the locals also use it for medicinal purposes; they make it into a paste called "malmal" and apply it on the joints to treat inflammation and arthritis. It is reported to be cultivated in Yemen, but this could be based on an 1870 record by Dr. G. Birdwood citing that B. frereana was seen in Sir Robert Playfair's garden in Aden (Yemen). Playfair had brought B. frereana from Somalia and cultivated it in his garden in Aden. Although rumored to also grow in Oman, scientific and botanical evidence does not confirm that B. frereana either grows or is cultivated there. B. frereana resin, however, is very rarely found in Omani markets in the larger cities as a less expensive and more palatable chewing resin compared to the native Omani frankincense, B. sacra, which is known more for its medicinal and aromatic properties.

In the West B. frereana is called "Coptic Frankincense" as this is the type and grade used by the Coptic Church of Egypt. 80% of B. frereana production is sold to Saudi Arabia where it is traditionally brought home by Muslim pilgrims. The remaining 20% is sold all around the world.

References

frereana
Endemic flora of Somalia
Trees of Africa
Somali montane xeric woodlands